Lamborn is a surname, and may refer to

 Lamborn (Hambledon cricketer), English cricketer of the 18th century 
 Chris Lamborn (born 1916), Australian rules footballer
 Doug Lamborn (born 1954), American politician
 Harry Lamborn (1915–1982), British politician
 Josiah Lamborn (1809–1847), American lawyer
 Kathleen Lamborn, American biostatistician
 Levi L. Lamborn (1829–1910), American doctor and politician
 Peter Spendelowe Lamborn (1722–1774), English engraver
 Peter Lamborn Wilson (born 1945), American anarchist
 Tony Lamborn (born 1991), New Zealand rugby player

Other
 Mount Lamborn, a mountain in Colorado

See also
 Lambourn (surname)
 Lambourne, a village in Essex, England